Tom Farrell (born 1 October 1993) is a rugby union player from Ireland. He primarily plays as a centre. Farrell currently plays for Irish provincial side Connacht in the Pro14. He has previously played for English club Bedford Blues in the RFU Championship as well as the London Irish 'A' team, and came through the Leinster academy.

Club career

Early career
Farrell joined the Leinster academy ahead of the 2013–14 season. During his time in the academy, Farrell featured for the province's second tier side, Leinster A, in the British and Irish Cup. He made a total of seven appearances for the side and scored a try against Carmarthen Quins. Farrell also played senior rugby for All-Ireland League club Lansdowne, and was named the league's "Rising Star of the Month" for March 2015. Farrell moved to London Irish in 2016 and was part of the club's A-League squad for the end of the 2015–16 season.

Bedford
In May 2016 Farrell signed with English Championship club Bedford Blues, joining them ahead of the 2016–17 season. He made his debut for the side against Jersey Reds on 11 September 2016. Farrell made 12 appearances for the Blues, with his final appearance coming against London Irish, before departing the club mid-season to return to Ireland.

Connacht
In January 2017, Farrell returned to Ireland after signing for the reigning Pro12 champions Connacht. Due to an injury crisis at centre, he immediately was added to the team's squad for the European Champions Cup.

International career
Farrell has represented Ireland internationally at under-age level. He was part of the Ireland under-20 squad for the 2013 Junior World Championship. He played in two of the team's three pool matches, starting in the victory over Australia and scoring a try in the defeat to New Zealand. Ireland finished second in their pool and Farrell started in the side's two knockout games against France and Australia, with Ireland ultimately finishing eighth overall.

Farrell was named in the squad for the opening rounds of the 2019 Six Nations.

References

1993 births
Living people
Bedford Blues players
Connacht Rugby players
Leinster Rugby players
Rugby union centres
Irish rugby union players